Automata I is the eighth studio album by American progressive metal band Between the Buried and Me. It was released on March 9, 2018, through Sumerian Records, their first release with the label. It is the first part of a two-piece album; the second, Automata II, was released on July 13, 2018.

Between the Buried and Me began recording the album on July 31, 2017, and finished on September 6, 2017, announcing it in January 2018 with 2018 tour dates set with The Dear Hunter and Leprous. Longtime producer and collaborator Jamie King returned to produce the album.

A music video for "Condemned to the Gallows" was released on January 19, 2018. On March 9, 2018, the band released the second music video from the album for the song, "Millions". The album was released later that same day.

Background
About the album, guitarist Paul Waggoner remarked:

Concept 
Automata is a concept album. According to an official press release, the album will revolve around the concept of being able to view the dreams of others, frontman Tommy Rogers commented:

During an interview with That Drummer Guy, he also added:

Reception 

Automata I received generally positive reviews from professional critics, noting the band's continued technical proficiency found in their previous albums, while some felt ambivalent of the album's significantly shorter length—drawing comparisons to their 2011 extended play, The Parallax: Hypersleep Dialogues, which is five minutes shorter—and the band's decision to release Automata in two parts. Review aggregator Metacritic scored the album a 70 out of 100 based on five music critics, citing "generally favorable reviews".

The Prog Report praised the album, referring to the song "Blot" as a "song [that] brings all the elements which one would expect—it doesn't disappoint", comparing the track with the sound of bands like Haken and Nova Collective (bassist Dan Briggs being a member of this band). They also add that the song "shines as it has everything BTBAM has to offer at the highest level of musical performance. The ending chorus is epic; but, just when you think a conclusion is due, the abrupt ending reminds us the second part is just a few months away..."

MetalSucks'''s Phil Boozeman gave the album 4 devil horns claiming "Automata is also a perfect jumping-on spot for new fans, as it winds up being one of the band's easiest-to-digest releases" and that "Musically, BTBAM are already in outer space while every other metal band remains stuck on earth — and yet Automata'' finds the band somehow continuing to push themselves in new territory". He also added that the song "Blot" "may very well represent BTBAM's strongest work to date".

Track listing

Personnel

Between the Buried and Me
 Dan Briggs – bass
 Blake Richardson – drums
 Tommy Giles Rogers Jr. – vocals, keyboards
 Paul Waggoner – guitars
 Dustie Waring – guitars

Additional personnel
 Jamie King – production, engineering, piano
 Kris Hilbert – piano, additional drum production
 Jens Bogren – mixing and mastering
 Kevin King – additional production
 Cameron MacManus – trombone, baritone saxophone
 Jonathan Wiseman – trumpet
 Corey Meyers – art direction/layout, photography
 Aaron Strelecki – photography
 Andrew Strelecki – photography

Charts

References

2018 albums
Between the Buried and Me albums
Sumerian Records albums
Concept albums
Albums produced by Jamie King (record producer)